Cymbium souliei, commonly known as the Soulie's volute is a species of sea snail, a marine gastropod mollusk in the family Volutidae, the volutes.

Description

Distribution
This marine species occurs off the Ivory Coast.

References

 Marche-Marchad, I. (1974). Une nouvelle espèce du genre ouest-africain Cymbium Röding (C. souliei, sp. Nov., Mollusca Prosobranchia, Volutidae). Bulletin de l'Institut Fondamental d'Afrique Noire. 35(1), sér. A: 62-68.

External links
 MNHN, Paris: holotype

Endemic fauna of Ivory Coast
Volutidae
Gastropods described in 1974